JK Loo is a football club, based in Loo, Estonia.

Founded in 2008, the club has played in the III liiga since 2015.

Players

Current squad
 ''As of 7 October 2018.

Statistics

League and Cup

References

Harju County
Loo
2008 establishments in Estonia